= Hudson v. Bloomfield Hills Public Schools (1995) =

Hudson v. Bloomfield Hills Public Schools, 910 F. Supp. 1291 (1995), is a case in which the United States District Court, E.D. Michigan, Southern Division affirmed the lower court's ruling that the needs of a student designated as "trainable mentally impaired" were better served at a middle school other than their neighborhood school, in accordance with the Individuals with Disabilities Education Act (IDEA).

== Background ==
Emily Hudson was a 14-year-old student certified as “trainable mentally impaired”, performing in math, spelling and reading at the first-grade level. During elementary school, Emily divided her day between a special day class and a mainstream classroom. Upon starting middle school, The Bloomfield Hills Public School District recommended continuing the split-day model at West Hills Middle School, as West Hills had a special education class. Emily’s mother, Mrs. Hudson, disagreed and requested Emily attend East Hills Middle School, her neighborhood school, for the entire school day in a mainstream classroom. Both parties agreed to a trial period where Emily would divide her day between West Hills and East Hills. At the end of the trial period, the school district again recommended placement at West Hills. Mrs. Hudson disagreed and requested a due process hearing. The hearing officer ruled in favor of the school district, and Mrs. Hudson appealed to the district court.

== Decision ==
The court found in favor of the Bloomfield Hills Public School District, citing overwhelming evidence that the district’s proposed placement at West Hills with a combination of special-day and mainstream classes constituted the most appropriate placement for Emily. Referring to the “least restrictive environment” mandate of IDEA, the court noted that the individual needs of the child may mean the most appropriate placement is not always the child’s neighborhood school. The court therefore agreed with the determination outlined in the original administrative hearing.
